Dave Kragthorpe (born May 1, 1933) is a former American football player  He was the head football coach at South Dakota State University in 1969, Idaho State University from 1980 to 1982, and Oregon State University from 1985 to 1990, compiling a career college football record of 41–69–2.

Early life
Kragthorpe attended Utah State University in Logan, where he excelled as a two-way tackle for the Aggies from 1951 to 1954. In addition, he was also on the baseball team. Despite all his athletic obligations, Kragthorpe graduated with double bachelor's degrees in physical education and recreation education in 1955. He played one season for the New York Giants as a guard, being taken 188th overall in the 1955 NFL draft. A short time later, he returned to Utah State and earned his master's degree in secondary education.

Coaching career
Kragthorpe was an assistant coach for two seasons at Montana and two at South Dakota State; he was promoted to head coach at SDSU in 1969, and posted a  He then served as offensive line coach and offensive coordinator at Brigham Young University, under former USU teammate LaVell Edwards from 1970 to 1975. Under Edwards' and Kragthorpe's leadership, the Cougars became one of the first programs committed to throwing the football in the 1970s, a time when "three yards and a cloud of dust" was still the dominant sentiment in college football. Kragthorpe continued to coach the offensive line under new offensive coordinator Doug Scovil from 1976 to 1979.

Idaho State
After a winless  in 1979 under Bud Hake, Idaho State athletic director, I. J. "Babe" Caccia decided to try to import some of the passing magic to Pocatello from nearby Provo, Utah.

The best results were definitely in his second season in 1981, when the Bengals won the Big Sky Conference title, hosted two playoff wins, and won the Division I-AA championship in Texas for a  season. They were led by senior quarterback Mike Machurek, a junior college transfer from California; he was a sixth round pick in the 1982 NFL Draft, serving as a reserve player with the Detroit Lions.

In June 1983, Kragthorpe stepped away from the sidelines to take over as athletics director at his alma mater, Utah State in Logan.

Oregon State 
Eighteen months later in December 1984, he returned to coaching, when he was hired to replace Joe Avezzano at Oregon State University  Once again, he implemented a pass-oriented offense for the 1985 season, penned the "Air Express." This offense did not correlate to much success in the Pacific-10 Conference, as Kragthorpe failed to have a winning record in any of his six seasons with Oregon State, compiling an overall record of  In recognition of how difficult the Oregon State job was perceived to be in those days, Kragthorpe won the Pac-10 Coach of the Year honors in 1989, despite having a losing record that year with the Beavers. Kragthorpe resigned from Oregon State on November 21, 1990, after an especially disappointing 1–10 result that season.

1985 Washington game
Despite Kragthorpe's record at Oregon State, he will be forever linked to one of the greatest wins in Oregon State history. In his first season at the helm of Oregon State, Kragthorpe took his  in to Husky Stadium in Seattle to take on the Washington Huskies as 38-point underdogs. After sixty minutes of play, and a blocked punt with 1:29 left to go in the game that was recovered for a Beaver touchdown, Oregon State pulled off what was then the largest upset by point spread in college football history,

Later life
In 1994, Kragthorpe was hired by the USU Alumni Association to resurrect the university's alumni chapters program. Despite officially retiring in 2001, Kragthorpe can still be found at his desk in the Alumni Office, overseeing the USU alumni chapters in Idaho and northern Nevada.

Kragthorpe is a member of the Old Main Society, Alumni Sustaining Membership program, Big Blue Club, and the Emeriti Association. In 2005, he received the Distinguished Alumnus Award. His son, Kurt, is a sportswriter for the Salt Lake Tribune, while another son, Steve, served as head coach at Tulsa and Louisville. Grandson, Brad Kragthorpe, is an assistant for the Cincinnati Bengals.

Kragthorpe and his wife, Barbara, split their time between Logan, Utah and Louisville, Kentucky.

Head coaching record

References

1933 births
Living people
BYU Cougars football coaches
Idaho State Bengals football coaches
Montana Grizzlies football coaches
New Mexico Lobos football coaches
Oregon State Beavers football coaches
South Dakota State Jackrabbits football coaches
Utah State Aggies athletic directors
Utah State Aggies baseball players
Utah State Aggies football players
High school football coaches in Idaho
High school football coaches in Michigan